Piranha, also known as Piranha, Piranha or Caribe, is a 1972 Venezuelan adventure-thriller film starring William Smith and Peter Brown who had previously starred together in the Laredo  Western TV series and Ahna Capri.

Plot
Art Greene (Tom Simcox) and his sister Terry (Ahna Capri) are a couple of wildlife photographers exploring the Amazon region with their American guide Jim Pendrake (Peter Brown). They stumble across a deadly predator when they meet Caribe (William Smith), a homicidal maniac whose hobbies include tracking and hunting human prey.

Cast
William Smith as Caribe
Peter Brown as Jim Pendrake
Ahna Capri as Terry Greene
Tom Simcox as Art Greene

Home media
Piranha was first released on DVD in 2000.

Notes

External links
 

1972 films
1970s thriller films
Films scored by Richard LaSalle
Films shot in Venezuela